Kitty Swan (born Kirsten Svanholm, 25 May 1943) is a Danish actress. She appeared in more than twelve films from 1966 to 1972.

Selected filmography

References

External links 

1943 births
Living people
Danish film actresses
Actresses from Copenhagen